The 1980 Maine Black Bears football team was an American football team that represented the University of Maine as a member of the Yankee Conference during the 1980 NCAA Division I-AA football season. In its fifth season under head coach Jack Bicknell, the team compiled a 4–7 record (1–4 against conference opponents) and finished fifth out of six teams in the Yankee Conference. Andrew Neilson, Peter A. Thiboutot, and John Tursky were the team captains.

Schedule

References

Maine
Maine Black Bears football seasons
Maine Black Bears football